The 1910 New Zealand tour rugby to Australia was the seventh tour by the New Zealand national team to Australia. Four matches were played against regional sides (all won) along with three Test matches between the two national sides. 

New Zealand won the series with two victories to one.

Touring party 
Manager: V.R.S Meredith
Captain: Fred Roberts

Match summary
Complete list of matches played by New Zealand in Australia: 

 Test matches

See also
 List of All Blacks tours and series

References

New Zealand
New Zealand tour
Australia tour
New Zealand national rugby union team tours of Australia